Daniela Franco is a Mexican conceptual artist and writer who lives and works in Paris. Her body of work is interdisciplinary and explores intersections between experimental writing, pop music and visual art through the creation of archives, temporary fictions and video. She is a San Francisco Art Institute and École nationale supérieure des Beaux-Arts alumna as well as a Fulbright scholar. Her projects have received support and grants from the Rockefeller Foundation, the Mexican National Council for Culture and Arts and Colección Júmex.

Projects 

Franco's first projects were done in video, using images and sounds from a poetical construction stand, for their form, euphony and rhythm. In On n’attend que toi  (2003), she illustrated Harry Mathews's poem Jack's Reminders to the King of Karactika with a series of travel images and Ian Monk's voice in off. Daniela Franco's work is often based on sets of self-imposed constraints much like the French literary group Oulipo whose members have often collaborated in Franco's projects.

Her latest work has been done in the form of interdisciplinary and collaborative projects of fiction and archiving that also question the role of authorship. In 2010 she created face B, an on-line archive for the contemporary art museum La Maison Rouge in Paris. Face B  archives LP covers selected by music critic Alex Ross, magazines like The Wire, Vice, Les Inrockuptibles, and McSweeney's, fashion designer agnès b., UbuWeb, the music label Alga Marghen, Oren Ambarchi, Clive Graham, the Oulipo, Philip Andelman for Colette, etc.<ref>[http://faceb.danielafranco.com/ List of face B'''s collaborators].</ref> Face B, l'envers de Vinyl and Face B: Phase 3 by Jean-Jacques Birgé.Sandys at Waikiki  is an artist book published in 2009 by Editorial RM. It is the result of the fictional search for the Sandys, a family that lived in California in the 1940s and 1950s. Having found the Sandys' slides at a flea market, Daniela Franco reconstructed their lives, inviting others to offer clues in the form of poems, letters and even an eyewitness testimony. Sandys at Waikiki includes texts by Enrique Vila-Matas, Sean Condon, André Alexis, Emmanuel Adely, Juan Villoro, Fabio Morábito, Marius Serra, and members of the Oulipo like Jacques Jouet, and Marcel Bénabou among other writers.

Daniela Franco writes about music and art for websites and magazines like Letras Libres or La Tempestad. She has translated Roy Spivey by Miranda July and Referential by Lorrie Moore (both originally published by The New Yorker) for the magazine Letras Libres. She has also interviewed and translated poet Kenneth Goldsmith.

References

 External links 

 
 Ortega y Cassette, Daniela Franco's Tumblr
 Website for the project face B 
 Press release for L'artiste portatif, project based on Enrique Vila-Matas's A Brief History of Portable Literature''
 Videos from a project curated by Daniela Franco for Mexico's Canal 22 were Electrelane, Fangoria, Riceboy Sleeps and others, revisit cult movies with their own music.

San Francisco Art Institute alumni
Mexican contemporary artists
Living people
Year of birth missing (living people)
Fulbright alumni